Soultana (Tania) Tsanaklidou (born 9 April 1952) is a Greek artist, both singer and actress, who represented Greece in the Eurovision Song Contest 1978.

Biography
Tania was born in Drama, Greece on 9 April 1952 and was raised in Thessaloniki. By the age of eight, she had already taken part in a children's theatrical play. She studied drama and ancient history and took courses in dancing. When she was 21 she moved to Athens where she started to work as a theatre actress and in 1978 she got her first part in a TV series.

In 1978, she represented Greece in the Eurovision Song Contest with a song titled "Charlie Chaplin", and came eighth. Right after this she performed at the award ceremony of the Cannes Film Festival. In 1980, she was awarded the prize of the French Festival Rose d'Or.

She began recording albums while concurrently performing in music appearances all over Greece.

Discography
 1978-Charlie Chaplin
 1978-Ares Mares Koukounares
 1980-Horis Taftotita
 1982-File
 1985-Tis Vrohis kai tis Nihtas
 1986-Clise
 1988-Ta tragoudia tou Bar
 1988-Mama Gernao
 1990-Alliotiki Mera
 1991-Nadir
 1995-Oi Megaliteres Epitihies tis Tanias Tsanaklidou
 1995-Tragoudia tou Paraxenou Kosmou
 1997-Live
 1998-To Magiko Kouti
 2000-Mia Agapi Mikri
 2001-To Hroma tis Imeras
 2009-Proswpografia

References

External links
 https://web.archive.org/web/20090304154855/http://www.tsanaklidou.com/

1952 births
Living people
People from Drama, Greece
Eurovision Song Contest entrants of 1978
Greek entehno singers
Eurovision Song Contest entrants for Greece
20th-century Greek women singers
Greek stage actresses
Thessaloniki Song Festival entrants
20th-century Greek actresses
21st-century Greek women singers